Akaki Khubutia (born 17 March 1986) is a Georgian professional footballer who plays as a defender.

Club career
On 3 September 2015, Zemplín Michalovce announced the signing of Georgian defender Akaki Khubutia. 

In 2018, he played for Poli Timișoara in Romania.

Honours

Club
FBK Kaunas
 A Lyga: 2007
 Lithuanian Cup: 2004, 2008
 Baltic League: 2008

Mordovia Saransk
 Russian National Football League: 2013–14

References

External links
 
 
 
 

1986 births
Living people
Footballers from Georgia (country)
Association football defenders
Georgia (country) international footballers
Georgia (country) under-21 international footballers
A Lyga players
Liga I players
Süper Lig players
Russian Premier League players
Super League Greece players
Slovak Super Liga players
Ukrainian First League players
FC Lokomotivi Tbilisi players
FC Dinamo Tbilisi players
FC Energetik-BGU Minsk players
FBK Kaunas footballers
FK Šilutė players
FC Vilnius players
CS Gaz Metan Mediaș players
Samsunspor footballers
FC Mordovia Saransk players
PAE Kerkyra players
MFK Zemplín Michalovce players
ACS Poli Timișoara players
Expatriate footballers from Georgia (country)
Expatriate sportspeople from Georgia (country) in Belarus
Expatriate footballers in Belarus
Expatriate sportspeople from Georgia (country) in Lithuania
Expatriate footballers in Lithuania
Expatriate sportspeople from Georgia (country) in Romania
Expatriate footballers in Romania
Expatriate sportspeople from Georgia (country) in Turkey
Expatriate footballers in Turkey
Expatriate sportspeople from Georgia (country) in Russia
Expatriate footballers in Russia
Expatriate sportspeople from Georgia (country) in Greece
Expatriate footballers in Greece
Expatriate sportspeople from Georgia (country) in Slovakia
Expatriate footballers in Slovakia
Expatriate sportspeople from Georgia (country) in Ukraine
Expatriate footballers in Ukraine
FC Metalurgi Rustavi players
FC Vitebsk players
FC VPK-Ahro Shevchenkivka players